The Replösa Stone (Also Småland Runic Inscription 35, Sm 35, and Ljungby 28:1) is a runestone in Replösa near Ljungby, Sweden.

The stone
The inscription is from the 11th century and says:

Inscription

Transliteration:
kutraþr : karþi : kubl : þisi : iftiR : astraþ : faþur : sin : þan : frita : ak : þih:na : bistan : iR a : f-n:iþ- : forþum : uf| |faRi :

Normalization to Old West Norse:
Gautráðr gerði kuml þessi eptir Ástráð, fôður sinn, þann frænda ok þegna beztan, er á F[i]nnheið[i] forðum of væri.

Translation to English:
 Götrad made this stone after Åstrad, their father, the foremost of kinsmen and thanes who in Finnveden formerly lived.

Interpretation
The Danish sounding names Götrad and Åstrad are uncommon. From the Middle Ages only a few persons are known to bear the name Åstrad. The name have also appeared on Danish runestones. The name Götrad does not appear on any other known runestone. Finnveden mentioned on the stone was one of the "countries" that would later be included in the province of Småland. Finnveden is mentioned on three runestones: Sm 35, Sm 52 in Småland, and U 130 in Uppland. The word "thane" (þegna) can be seen in a number of runic inscriptions, but opinions are divided of its meaning. The two main opinions are "free farmer, odalman (Similar to yeomen)" respectively "warrior, member of the king's hird".

The ship setting

Just south of the runestone lies Ljungby 29:1, a damaged, but partly restored, ship setting. According to historical data there have been twelve stones.

See also
 History of Sweden (800–1521)

References

Runestones in Småland
11th-century inscriptions